Kashkuiyeh (also Romanized as Kashkū’īyeh) is a village in Dar Agah Rural District, in the Central District of Hajjiabad County, Hormozgan Province, Iran. At the 2006 census, its population was 239, in 66 families.

References 

Populated places in Hajjiabad County